Neelam (Also spelled Neelum) is a village in  Neelam Valley, Azad Kashmir, Pakistan.

See also
Kundal Shahi
Kutton
Athmuqam
Sharda
Kel

References

Populated places in Neelam District
Hill stations in Pakistan
2005 Kashmir earthquake